Pedro Wonaeamirri is a contemporary Aboriginal Australian painter, carver, printmaker, singer, dancer, and performer. As a member of the Tiwi people, Wonaeamirri regards his art as both a continuation of Tiwi culture as well as an open-ended exploration of style and technique.

Biography 
Wonaeamirri was born in 1974 at Pirlangimpi, Melville Island. Raised by his grandmother, Jacinta Wonaeamirri, Pedro Wonaeamirri was taught the Tiwi cultural customs and artforms by both the members of his kin and of his community. Wonaeamirri learned how to carve under the guidance of his uncle, Romuald Puruntatameri, and learned how to paint by watching elder artists at Jilamara Arts and Crafts, such as Kitty Kantilla and Paddy Freddy Puruntatameri. Wonaeamirri is also an experienced singer and dancer, both of which form an important part of Tiwi culture.

Career 
Wonaeamirri began his career at Jilamara Arts and Crafts in 1991, for which he has since served as an artist, Vice President, and President of the center. Wonaeamirri has exhibited widely in both solo and group exhibitions (see Significant Exhibitions), and has also been recognized or considered for numerous awards (see Recognitions).

Style 
Wonaeamirri uses traditional natural pigments and materials collected from his country, including ochre, feathers, beeswax, and wood. In his paintings Wonaeamirri utilizes kayimwagakimi, the traditional Tiwi wood comb, to create dotted infill, which is overlain upon fields of red, yellow, white, and black. Wonaeamirri depicts pwoja (body painting designs) in a style that is both distinctly Tiwi and unique to himself, by experimenting with designs and patterns while alluding to an illustrious cultural history.

Significant exhibitions 

 All About Art, White Canvas, Brisbane (2015)
 We are Tiwi: Art from Jilamara & Munupi Artists, Kluge-Ruhe Aboriginal Art Collection, Virginia, United States (2014)
 The Tiwi: Art from Jilamara & Munupi Artists, Harvey Art Projects, Ketchum, Idaho, United States (2013)
 Art+Soul: A Journey into the World of Aboriginal Art, Art Gallery of New South Wales, Sydney (2010); Country, Culture, Community, Art Gallery of New South Wales, Sydney (2009)
 The Dreamers, Art Gallery of New South Wales, Sydney (2009)
 One Sun, One Moon: Aboriginal Art in Australia, Art Gallery of New South Wales, Sydney (2007)
 Primavera, Museum of Contemporary Art, Sydney (2005)
 The 19th Asian International Art Exhibition, Fukuoka Asian Art Museum, Fukuoka, Japan (2004)
 Place Made: Australian Print Workshop, National Gallery of Australia, Canberra (2004)
 Islands in the Sun, National Gallery of Australia, Canberra (2001)
 Beyond the Pale: Contemporary Indigenous Art, 2000 Adelaide Biennial of Australian Art, Art Gallery of South Australia, Adelaide (2000)
 Australian Perspecta 1999: Living Here Now – Art and Politics, Art Gallery of New South Wales, Sydney (1999)
 Art of the Tiwi, National Gallery of Victoria, Melbourne (1994)
 Nginingawila Jilamara Kapi Purunguparri (Our Designs on Bark)National Gallery of Victoria, Melbourne (1992)

Recognitions 

 Finalist, National Aboriginal and Torres Strait Islander Award (1994, 1995, 2004, 2005, 2007, 2009 and 2012)
 Finalist, Shell Fremantle Print Award, Fremantle Arts Centre, Perth (2000) 
 Finalist, Togart Contemporary Art Award, Darwin (2007)
 Recipient, Australia Council Fellowship (1996)
 Recipient, Young Australian of the Year (Arts Section, Northern Territory; 2000)

References

Further reading 
 ABC International, and Films for the Humanities & Sciences (Firm). Dreams and Nightmares: Memory and the Spirit World In Australia's Indigenous Art. Films Media Group, 2010.
 Baum, Tina, et al. Defying Empire: 3rd National Indigenous Art Triennial. National Gallery of Australia, 2017.
 Butler, Roger, and Anne Virgo. Place Made: Australian Print Workshop. National Gallery of Australia, 2004.
 Catherine Keenan. "Carving Out a Link to Past." Sydney Morning Herald, The, 8 Jul. 2002, pp. 13 – 12.
 Crispin, Geoff. "OLD WAYS - NEW CULTURAL STORYTELLERS." Craft Arts International, no. 93, 1 Mar. 2015, pp. 80 – 82.
 Knight, Beverly, et al. Australian Stories. Alcaston Gallery, 2011.
 Watson, Ken, et al. Tradition Today: Indigenous Art In Australia. Art Gallery of New South Wales, 2004.

Living people
1974 births
20th-century Australian artists
21st-century Australian artists
Tiwi Islands people